Jolanda Batagelj (previously known as Jolanda Čeplak  until 2002, born Jolanda Steblovnik on September 12, 1976) is a Slovenian middle distance athlete. She was born in Celje and lived in Velenje until briefly moving to Monaco. She has lived in Celje since.

Running career
In her early career, she did not specialise, and ran at many distances. She later settled on the 800 metres where she found relative success on the IAAF Golden League circuit, despite having to compete against Maria de Lurdes Mutola, who went unbeaten at all major championships from 1999 until the 2004 Summer Olympics.

Her most successful season was 2002. On March 2 at the European Indoor Championships in Vienna she beat local favourite Stephanie Graf and set the indoor world record at 1:55.82. In the same year at the European Championships in Munich she became the European champion.

At the 2004 Olympics in Athens, Čeplak finished very strongly in the 800 m but could not quite catch winner Kelly Holmes and finished with exactly the same time as Hasna Benhassi. A photo-finish showed her in third-place, winning the bronze medal.

PED use and suspension

On 18 June 2007, Čeplak tested positive on erythropoietin. On 26 July, IAAF announced that the B test confirmed the result of the A test. Čeplak said that she has never taken any illegal substances and would try to prove her innocence with all means possible. She received a two-year suspension, and returned to competition in July 2009.

Personal life

After a divorce from Aleš Čeplak in 2007, she married a triple jumper Andrej Batagelj from Nova Gorica in 2009. They live in Celje.

Major achievements 
 2002
 European Indoor Championships – Vienna, Austria.
 800 m gold medal and world record
 European Championships – Munich, Germany.
 800 m gold medal
 IAAF World Cup - Madrid, Spain.
 800 m bronze medal
 European Cup B League Final – Banská Bystrica, Slovakia.
 800 m gold medal
 2003
 European Cup B League Final – Velenje, Slovenia.
 800 m gold medal
 2004
 2004 Summer Olympics – Athens, Greece.
 800 m bronze medal
 World Indoor Championships – Budapest, Hungary.
 800 m silver medal
 2007
 European Indoor Championships – Birmingham, England.
 800 m bronze medal

See also
List of sportspeople sanctioned for doping offences

References

External links 
 Official Website
 

1976 births
Living people
Slovenian expatriates in Monaco
Slovenian female middle-distance runners
Athletes (track and field) at the 2000 Summer Olympics
Athletes (track and field) at the 2004 Summer Olympics
Olympic athletes of Slovenia
Olympic bronze medalists for Slovenia
Doping cases in athletics
Slovenian sportspeople in doping cases
Sportspeople from Celje
People from Monte Carlo
Expatriate sportspeople in Monaco
European Athletics Championships medalists
Medalists at the 2004 Summer Olympics
Olympic bronze medalists in athletics (track and field)
World Athletics indoor record holders
Mediterranean Games silver medalists for Slovenia
Mediterranean Games medalists in athletics
Athletes (track and field) at the 1997 Mediterranean Games
Athletes (track and field) at the 2001 Mediterranean Games